Herman Hu (Chinese: 胡曉明) (born February 1954) was the Chairman of the Council of City University of Hong Kong from 2012 to 2017. Hu is a Member of the Chinese People's Political Consultative Conference (CPPCC) and Hong Kong deputy to the 12th & 13th National People's Congress of the People's Republic of China (NPC). Hu was one of the first Election Committee members to nominate Leung Chun-ying for the post of Chief Executive of Hong Kong. Hu is the head of Ryoden Development Ltd and is the son of Hu Fa-kuang.

References

1954 births
Living people
City University of Hong Kong
Delegates to the 12th National People's Congress from Hong Kong
Delegates to the 13th National People's Congress from Hong Kong
Delegates to the 14th National People's Congress from Hong Kong
Members of the Election Committee of Hong Kong, 2007–2012
Members of the Election Committee of Hong Kong, 2012–2017
Members of the Election Committee of Hong Kong, 2017–2021
Members of the National Committee of the Chinese People's Political Consultative Conference
Hong Kong businesspeople